Vidmer is a surname. Notable people with the surname include:

A. W. Vidmer, American film director and screenwriter
Dick Vidmer (born 1944), American football player
Tatiana Vidmer (born 1986), Russian basketball player

See also
Vidmar